Nesterikha is a rural locality (a village) in Markushevskoye Rural Settlement, Tarnogsky District, Vologda Oblast, Russia. The population was 3 as of 2002.

Geography 
Nesterikha is located 23 km southeast of Tarnogsky Gorodok (the district's administrative centre) by road. Andreyevskaya is the nearest rural locality.

References 

Rural localities in Tarnogsky District